Fathia Youssouf, also known by her full name Fathia Youssouf Abdillahi, born on August 1, 2006, in Brest, is a French actress.

Biography 
Fathia Youssouf was born on August 1, 2006 in Brest to a Djiboutian mother and a Guadeloupean father, both engineers.

It was while responding to an ad on Facebook that Fathia Youssouf was spotted by casting director Tania Arana. When she was 11, director Maïmouna Doucouré gave her the lead role in her feature film Mignonnes. Fathia Youssouf's first role was that of an 11-year-old girl who is ready to do anything to feel included in a group of girls. The film denounces the influence of social networks on preadolescent girls, and their early hypersexualization.

Awards 

 The New York Times Magazine ranked 13th best actress of the year 2020
 César Award for Most Promising Actress for Mignonnes

References 

Living people
2006 births
French child actresses
French film actresses
Actors from Brest, France
French people of Djiboutian descent
French people of Guadeloupean descent
21st-century French actresses